The 2014 NHL Entry Draft was the 52nd NHL Entry Draft. The draft was held on June 27–28, 2014 at the Wells Fargo Center in Philadelphia, Pennsylvania. The top three selections were Aaron Ekblad, Sam Reinhart and Leon Draisaitl, going to the Florida Panthers, Buffalo Sabres and Edmonton Oilers, respectively. This draft featured the first selection of a player from Oceania with Australian Nathan Walker, being selected by the Washington Capitals in the third-round.

Eligibility
Ice hockey players born between January 1, 1994, and September 15, 1996, are eligible for selection in the 2014 NHL Entry Draft. Additionally, un-drafted, non-North American players born in 1993 are eligible for the draft; and those players who were drafted in the 2012 NHL Entry Draft, but not signed by an NHL team and who were born after June 30, 1994, are also eligible to re-enter the draft.

Draft lottery
Since the 2012–13 season, all 14 teams not qualifying for the Stanley Cup playoffs have a "weighted" chance at winning the first overall selection. The Florida Panthers won the 2014 draft lottery that took place on April 15, 2014, thus moving them from the second-overall pick to the first-overall pick.

Top prospects
Source: NHL Central Scouting final (April 8, 2014) ranking.

Selections by round
The order of the 2014 Entry Draft is listed below.

Round one

Notes
 The Ottawa Senators' first-round pick went to the Anaheim Ducks as the result of a trade on July 5, 2013, that sent Bobby Ryan to Ottawa in exchange for Jakob Silfverberg, Stefan Noesen and this pick.
 The San Jose Sharks' first-round pick went to the Chicago Blackhawks as the result of a trade on June 27, 2014 that sent a first-round pick in 2014 (27th overall) and Florida's third-round pick in 2014 (62nd overall) to San Jose in exchange for the Rangers sixth-round pick in 2014 (179th overall) and this pick.
 The Anaheim Ducks' first-round pick went to the Vancouver Canucks as the result of a trade on June 27, 2014 that sent Ryan Kesler and a third-round pick in 2015 to Anaheim in exchange for Nick Bonino, Luca Sbisa, a third-round pick in 2014 (85th overall) and this pick.
 The Chicago Blackhawks' first-round pick went to the San Jose Sharks as the result of a trade on June 27, 2014 that sent a first-round pick in 2014 (20th overall) and the Rangers sixth-round pick in 2014 (179th overall) to Chicago in exchange for Florida's third-round pick in 2014 (62nd overall) and this pick.
 The New York Rangers' first-round pick went to the New York Islanders as the result of a trade on June 27, 2014 that sent the Islanders and Montreal's second-round picks both in 2014 (35th and 57th overall) to Tampa Bay in exchange for this pick.
Tampa Bay previously acquired this pick as the result of a trade on March 5, 2014 that sent Martin St. Louis and a conditional second-round pick in 2015 to New York in exchange for Ryan Callahan, a first-round pick in 2015, a conditional seventh-round pick in 2015 and this pick (being conditional at the time of the trade). The condition – Tampa Bay will receive a first-round pick in 2014 if the Rangers advance to the 2014 Eastern Conference Final – was converted on May 13, 2014.
 The New Jersey Devils picked 30th overall in the first round. The Devils were expected to forfeit their first-round pick in 2014 (they elected to keep their first-round picks in 2011, 2012 and 2013) as the result of a penalty sanction due to cap circumvention when signing Ilya Kovalchuk. The penalty also included a fine of $3 million and the forfeit of the Devils' third round pick in 2011. The NHL kept most of the penalties, except for modifying the first-round pick and reducing the fine to $1.5 million.

Round two

Notes
 The Edmonton Oilers' second-round pick went to the St. Louis Blues as the result of a trade on July 10, 2013 that sent David Perron and a third-round pick in 2015 to Edmonton in exchange for Magnus Paajarvi, a fourth-round pick in 2015 and this pick.
 The New York Islanders' second-round pick went to the Tampa Bay Lightning as the result of a trade on June 27, 2014 that sent the Rangers first-round pick in 2014 (28th overall) to New York in exchange for Montreal's second-round pick in 2014 (57th overall) and this pick.
 The Toronto Maple Leafs' second-round pick went to the Anaheim Ducks as the result of a trade on November 16, 2013 that sent Peter Holland and Brad Staubitz to Toronto in exchange for Jesse Blacker, Anaheim's seventh-round pick in 2014 and this pick (being conditional at the time of the trade). The condition – Anaheim will receive a second-round pick in 2014 if Holland plays in 25 or more games for the Maple Leafs during the 2013–14 NHL season – was converted on January 18, 2014.
 The Winnipeg Jets' second-round pick went to the Washington Capitals as the result of a trade on June 28, 2014 that sent a second and third-round pick in 2014 (44th and 74th overall) to Buffalo in exchange for this pick.
Buffalo previously acquired this pick as the result of a trade on March 5, 2014 that sent Matt Moulson and Cody McCormick to Minnesota for Torrey Mitchell, a second-round pick in 2016 and this pick.
Minnesota previously acquired this pick as the result of a trade on July 5, 2013 that sent Devin Setoguchi to Winnipeg in exchange for this pick.
 The Washington Capitals' second-round pick went to the Buffalo Sabres as the result of a trade on June 28, 2014 that sent Winnipeg's second-round pick in 2014 (39th overall) to Washington in exchange for a third-round pick in 2014 (74th overall) and this pick.
 The Detroit Red Wings' second-round pick went to the San Jose Sharks as the result of a trade on June 28, 2014 that sent second-round pick in 2014 (51st overall) and a fourth-round pick in 2015 to Nashville in exchange for this pick.
Nashville previously acquired this pick as the result of a trade on March 5, 2014 that sent David Legwand to Detroit in exchange for Patrick Eaves, Calle Jarnkrok, and this pick (being conditional at the time of the trade). The condition – Nashville will receive a second-round pick in 2014 if Detroit qualifies for the 2014 Stanley Cup playoffs – was converted on April 9, 2014.
 The Minnesota Wild's second-round pick went to the Buffalo Sabres as the result of trade on April 3, 2013 that sent Jason Pominville and a fourth-round pick in 2014 to Minnesota in exchange for Matt Hackett, Johan Larsson, a first-round pick in 2013 and this pick.
The Tampa Bay Lightning's second-round pick went to the Los Angeles Kings as the result of a trade on June 28, 2014 that sent Linden Vey to Vancouver in exchange for this pick.
Vancouver previously acquired this pick as the result of a trade on June 27, 2014 that sent Jason Garrison, the rights to Jeff Costello and a seventh-round pick in 2015 to Tampa Bay in exchange for this pick.
 The San Jose Sharks' second-round pick went to the Nashville Predators as the result of a trade on June 28, 2014 that sent Detroit's second-round pick in 2014 (46th overall) to San Jose in exchange for a fourth-round pick in 2015 and this pick.
 The Pittsburgh Penguins' second-round pick went to the San Jose Sharks as the result of a trade on March 25, 2013 that sent Douglas Murray to Pittsburgh in exchange for a second-round pick in 2013 and this pick (being conditional at the time of the trade). The condition – If Pittsburgh wins two rounds in the 2013 playoffs or if Murray re-signs with Pittsburgh, then San Jose will receive Pittsburgh's second-round pick in 2014 – was converted on May 24, 2013 when Pittsburgh advanced to the 2013 Eastern Conference Finals.
 The Colorado Avalanche's second-round pick went to the Calgary Flames as the result of a trade on March 5, 2014 that sent Reto Berra to Colorado in exchange for this pick.
 The Montreal Canadiens' second-round pick went to the Tampa Bay Lightning as the result of a trade on June 27, 2014 that sent the Rangers first-round pick in 2014 (28th overall) to the New York Islanders in exchange for the Islanders second-round pick in 2014 (35th overall) and this pick.
The Islanders previously acquired this pick as the result of a trade on March 5, 2014 that sent Thomas Vanek and a conditional fifth-round pick in 2014 to Montreal in exchange for Sebastian Collberg and this pick (being conditional at the time of the trade). The condition – New York will receive a second-round pick in 2014 if Montreal qualifies for the 2014 Stanley Cup playoffs – was converted on April 1, 2014.
 The Chicago Blackhawks' second-round pick went to the Arizona Coyotes as the result of a trade on March 4, 2014 that sent David Rundblad and Mathieu Brisebois to Chicago in exchange for this pick.
 The Los Angeles Kings' second-round pick was re-acquired as the result of a trade on March 5, 2014 that sent Hudson Fasching and Nicolas Deslauriers to Buffalo in exchange for Brayden McNabb, Jonathan Parker, Los Angeles' second-round pick in 2015 and this pick.
Buffalo previously acquired this pick as the result of a trade on April 1, 2013 that sent Robyn Regehr to Los Angeles in exchange for a second-round pick in 2015 and this pick.

Round three

Notes
 The Florida Panthers' third-round pick went to the Nashville Predators as the result of a trade on June 28, 2014 that sent a third and fourth-round pick (72nd and 102nd overall) both in 2014 to San Jose in exchange for this pick.
San Jose previously acquired this pick as the result of a trade on June 27, 2014 that sent a first-round pick and the Rangers sixth-round pick both in 2014 (20th and 179th overall) to Chicago in exchange for a first-round pick in 2014 (27th overall) and this pick.
Chicago previously acquired this pick as the result of a trade on March 2, 2014 that sent Brandon Pirri to Florida in exchange for a fifth-round pick in 2016 and this pick.
 The Edmonton Oilers' third-round pick went to the Detroit Red Wings as the result of a trade on June 28, 2014 that sent a third-round pick in 2014 (76th overall) and a third-round pick in 2015 to Columbus in exchange for this pick.
Columbus previously acquired this pick as the result of a trade on March 5, 2014 that sent Marian Gaborik to Los Angeles in exchange for Matt Frattin, a second-round pick in 2014 or 2015 and this pick (being conditional at the time of the trade). The condition – Columbus will receive a third-round pick if Los Angeles wins one round in the 2014 Stanley Cup playoffs – was converted on April 30, 2014.
Los Angeles previously acquired this pick as the result of a trade on January 15, 2014 that sent Ben Scrivens to Edmonton in exchange for this pick.
 The New York Islanders' third-round pick went to the Florida Panthers as the result of a trade on June 28, 2014 that sent a third-round pick in 2015 to New York in exchange for this pick.
 The Nashville Predators third-round pick went to the San Jose Sharks as the result of a trade on June 28, 2014 that sent Florida's third-round pick in 2014 (62nd overall) to Nashville in exchange for a fourth-round pick in 2014 (102nd overall) and this pick.
 The Arizona Coyotes' third-round pick went to the Montreal Canadiens as the result of a trade on June 28, 2014 that sent a third and fourth-round pick in 2014 (87th and 117th overall) to Arizona in exchange for this pick.
 The Washington Capitals' third-round pick went to the Buffalo Sabres as the result of a trade on June 28, 2014 that sent Winnipeg's second-round pick in 2014 (39th overall) to Washington in exchange for a second-round pick in 2014 (44th overall) and this pick.
 The Detroit Red Wings' third-round pick went to the Columbus Blue Jackets as the result of a trade on June 28, 2014 that sent Edmonton's third-round pick in 2014 (63rd overall) to Detroit in exchange for a third-round pick in 2015 and this pick.
 The Philadelphia Flyers' third-round pick went to the New York Islanders as the result of a trade March 4, 2014 that sent Andrew MacDonald to Philadelphia in exchange for Matt Mangene, a second-round pick in 2015 and this pick.
 The Minnesota Wild's third-round pick went to the Tampa Bay Lightning as the result of a trade on June 28, 2014 that sent a third-round pick in 2014 (80th overall) and a seventh-round pick in 2015 to Minnesota in exchange for this pick.
 The Tampa Bay Lightning's third-round pick went to the Minnesota Wild as the result of a trade on June 28, 2014 that sent a third-round pick in 2014 (79th overall) to Tampa Bay in exchange for a seventh-round pick in 2015 and this pick.
 The Pittsburgh Penguins' third-round pick went to the Chicago Blackhawks as the result of a trade on June 28, 2014 that sent Brandon Bollig to Calgary in exchange for this pick.
Calgary previously acquired this pick as the result of a trade on March 5, 2014 that sent Lee Stempniak to Pittsburgh in exchange for this pick.
 The Anaheim Ducks' third-round pick went to the New York Rangers as the result of a trade on June 27, 2014 that sent Derek Dorsett to Vancouver in exchange for this pick.
Vancouver previously acquired this pick as the result of a trade on June 27, 2014 that sent Ryan Kesler and a third-round pick in 2015 to Anaheim in exchange for Nick Bonino, Luca Sbisa, a first-round pick in 2014 (24th overall) and this pick.
 The Boston Bruins' third-round pick went to the Philadelphia Flyers as the result of a trade on March 5, 2014 that sent Andrej Meszaros to Boston in exchange for this pick (being conditional at the time of the trade). The condition – Philadelphia will receive a third-round pick in 2014 if Meszaros does not re-sign with Boston prior to the 2014 NHL Entry Draft – was converted on June 27, 2014.
 The Montreal Canadiens' third-round pick went to the Arizona Coyotes as the result of a trade on June 28, 2014 that sent a third-round pick in 2014 (73rd overall) to Montreal in exchange for a fourth-round pick in 2014 (117th overall) and this pick.
 The New York Rangers' third-round pick went to the Washington Capitals as the result of a trade on June 28, 2014 that sent a fourth-round pick in 2014 (104th overall) and Chicago's fourth-round pick in 2014 (118th overall) to New York in exchange for this pick.

Round four

Notes
 The Buffalo Sabres' fourth-round pick went to the Edmonton Oilers as the result of a trade on March 4, 2014 that sent Ilya Bryzgalov to Minnesota in exchange for this pick.
Minnesota previously acquired this pick as the result of trade on April 3, 2013 that sent Matt Hackett, Johan Larsson, a first-round pick in 2013 and a second-round pick in 2014 to Buffalo in exchange for Jason Pominville and this pick.
 The Edmonton Oilers' fourth-round pick went to the Colorado Avalanche as the result of a trade on April 3, 2013 that sent Ryan O'Byrne to Toronto in exchange for this pick.
Toronto previously acquired this pick as the result of a trade on March 4, 2013 that sent Mike Brown to Edmonton in exchange for this pick (being conditional at the time of the trade). The condition – Toronto will receive a fourth-round pick in 2014 if Edmonton fails to qualify for the 2013 Stanley Cup playoffs – was converted on April 21, 2013.
 The Calgary Flames' fourth-round pick went to the St. Louis Blues as the result of a trade on June 28, 2014 that sent Roman Polak to Toronto in exchange for Carl Gunnarsson and this pick.
Toronto previously acquired this pick as the result of a trade on September 29, 2013 that sent Joe Colborne to Calgary in exchange for this pick (being conditional at the time of the trade). The condition – If Calgary fails to qualify for the 2014 Stanley Cup playoffs then this pick will remain a fourth-round pick in 2014 – was converted on March 30, 2014.
 The Vancouver Canucks' fourth-round pick went to the Carolina Hurricanes as the result of a trade on September 29, 2013 that sent Zac Dalpe and Jeremy Welsh to Vancouver in exchange for Kellan Tochkin and this pick.
 The Toronto Maple Leafs' fourth-round pick went to the Chicago Blackhawks as the result of a trade June 30, 2013 that sent Dave Bolland to Toronto in exchange for a second-round pick in 2013, Anaheim's fourth-round pick in 2013 and this pick.
 The New Jersey Devils' fourth-round pick went to the Winnipeg Jets as the result of a trade on February 13, 2013 that sent Alexei Ponikarovsky to New Jersey in exchange for a seventh-round pick in 2013 and this pick.
 The Nashville Predators fourth-round pick went to the San Jose Sharks as the result of a trade on June 28, 2014 that sent Florida's third-round pick in 2014 (62nd overall) to Nashville in exchange for a third-round pick in 2014 (72nd overall) and this pick.
 The Arizona Coyotes' fourth-round pick went to the Toronto Maple Leafs as the result of a trade on January 16, 2013 that sent Matthew Lombardi to Phoenix in exchange for this pick (being conditional at the time of the trade). The condition – If Lombardi does not re-sign with Phoenix for the 2013–14 season, then Toronto will receive a fourth-round pick in 2014 – was converted on August 29, 2013.
 The Washington Capitals' foutrth-round pick went to the New York Rangers as the result of a trade on June 28, 2014 that sent a third-round pick in 2014 (89th overall) to Washington in exchange for Chicago's fourth-round pick in 2014 (118th overall) and this pick.
 The Philadelphia Flyers' fourth-round pick went to the New York Islanders as the result of a trade on June 12, 2013 that sent Mark Streit to Philadelphia in exchange for Shane Harper and this pick.
 The Tampa Bay Lightning's fourth-round pick went to the St. Louis Blues as the result of a trade on July 10, 2012 that sent B. J. Crombeen and a fifth-round pick in 2014 to Tampa Bay in exchange for a fourth-round pick in 2013 and this pick.
 The San Jose Sharks' fourth-round pick went to the Edmonton Oilers as the result of a trade on October 21, 2013 that sent Mike Brown to San Jose in exchange for this pick.
 The St. Louis Blues' fourth-round pick went to the Nashville Predators as the result of a trade on June 30, 2013 that sent a fourth-round pick in 2013 to St. Louis in exchange for a seventh-round pick in 2013 and this pick.
 The Anaheim Ducks' fourth-round pick went to the Dallas Stars as the result of a trade on March 4, 2014 that sent Stephane Robidas to Anaheim in exchange for this pick (being conditional at the time of the trade). The condition – Dallas will receive a third-round pick in 2014 if Anaheim advances to the 2014 Western Conference Final and Robidas plays in at least 50% of Anaheim's playoff games. If both conditions are not converted then this will remain a fourth-round pick. – was converted on April 21, 2014 when Robidas was injured for the remainder of the 2014 Stanley Cup playoffs.
Anaheim previously re-acquired this pick as the result of a trade on March 4, 2014 that sent Dustin Penner to Washington in exchange for this pick.
Washington previously acquired this pick as the result of a trade on September 29, 2013 that sent Mathieu Perreault to Anaheim in exchange for John Mitchell and this pick.
 The Montreal Canadiens' fourth-round pick went to the Arizona Coyotes as the result of a trade on June 28, 2014 that sent a third-round pick in 2014 (73rd overall) to Montreal in exchange for a third-round pick in 2014 (87th overall) and this pick.
 The Chicago Blackhawks' fourth-round pick went to the New York Rangers as the result of a trade on June 28, 2014 that sent a third-round pick in 2014 (89th overall) to Washington in exchange for a fourth-round pick in 2014 (104th overall) and this pick.
Washington previously acquired this pick as the result of a trade on May 1, 2014 that sent Jaroslav Halak to the New York Islanders in exchange for this pick.
New York previously acquired this pick as the result of a trade on February 6, 2014 that sent Peter Regin and Pierre-Marc Bouchard to Chicago in exchange for this pick.
 The New York Rangers' fourth-round pick went to the Tampa Bay Lightning as the result of a trade on June 28, 2014 that sent a fifth-round pick in 2014 (140th overall) and St. Louis' fifth-round pick in 2014 (142nd overall) to New York in exchange for this pick.

Round five

Notes
 The Florida Panthers' fifth-round pick went to the New York Rangers as the result of a trade on July 20, 2012 that sent Casey Wellman to Florida in exchange for this pick.
 The Edmonton Oilers' fifth-round pick went to the Anaheim Ducks as the result of a trade on March 4, 2014 that sent Viktor Fasth to Edmonton in exchange for a third-round pick in 2015 and this pick.
 The Calgary Flames' fifth-round pick went to the St. Louis Blues as the result of a trade on July 5, 2013 that sent Kris Russell to Calgary in exchange for this pick.
 The New York Islanders' fifth-round pick went to the Montreal Canadiens as the result of a trade on March 5, 2014 that sent Sebastian Collberg and a conditional second-round pick in 2014 to New York in exchange for Thomas Vanek and this pick (being conditional at the time of the trade). The condition – Montreal will receive a fifth-round pick in 2014 if Montreal qualifies for the 2014 Stanley Cup playoffs – was converted on April 1, 2014.
 The Ottawa Senators' fifth-round pick went to the Edmonton Oilers as the result of a trade on March 5, 2014 that sent Ales Hemsky to Ottawa in exchange for a third-round pick in 2015 and this pick.
 The Columbus Blue Jackets' fifth-round pick was re-acquired as the result of a trade on June 25, 2014 that sent Nikita Nikitin to Edmonton in exchange for this pick.
Edmonton previously acquired this pick as the result of a trade March 5, 2014 that sent Nick Schultz to Columbus in exchange for this pick.
 The Tampa Bay Lightning's fifth-round pick went to the New York Rangers as the result of a trade on June 28, 2014 that sent a fourth-round pick in 2014 (119th overall) to Tampa Bay in exchange for St. Louis' fifth-round pick in 2014 (142nd overall) and this pick.
 The San Jose Sharks' fifth-round pick went to the Chicago Blackhawks as the result of a trade on June 30, 2013 that sent Anaheim's fourth-round pick in 2013 and a fifth-round pick in 2013 to San Jose in exchange for a fourth-round pick in 2013 and this pick.
 The St. Louis Blues' fifth-round pick went to the New York Rangers as the result of a trade on June 28, 2014 that sent a fourth-round pick in 2014 (119th overall) to Tampa Bay in exchange for a fifth-round pick in 2014 (140th overall) and this pick.
Tampa Bay previously acquired this pick as the result of a trade on July 10, 2012 that sent fourth-round picks in 2013 and 2014 to St. Louis in exchange for B. J. Crombeen and this pick.
 The Pittsburgh Penguins' fifth-round pick went to the Florida Panthers as the result of a trade on March 5, 2014 that sent Marcel Goc to Pittsburgh in exchange for a third-round pick in 2015 and this pick.
 The Anaheim Ducks' fifth-round pick went to the Pittsburgh Penguins as the result of a trade on February 6, 2013 that sent Ben Lovejoy to Anaheim in exchange for this pick.
 The New York Rangers' fifth-round pick went to the San Jose Sharks as the result of a trade on April 2, 2013 that sent Ryane Clowe to New York in exchange for a second-round pick in 2013, Florida's third-round pick in 2013 and this pick (being conditional at the time of the trade). The condition – If Clowe does not re-sign with New York and the Rangers do not advance to the Eastern Conference Final then San Jose will receive a fifth-round pick in 2014 – was converted on July 5, 2013.

Round six

Notes
 The Florida Panthers' sixth-round pick went to the New Jersey Devils as the result of a trade on September 28, 2013 that sent Krys Barch and St. Louis' seventh-round pick in 2015 to Florida in exchange for Scott Timmins and this pick.
 The Calgary Flames' sixth-round pick went to the Dallas Stars as the result of a trade on November 22, 2013 that sent Lane MacDermid to Calgary in exchange for this pick.
 The Carolina Hurricanes' sixth-round pick went to the Los Angeles Kings as the result of a trade on January 13, 2013 that sent Kevin Westgarth to Carolina in exchange for Anthony Stewart, a 4th round pick in 2013, and this pick.
 The Winnipeg Jets' sixth-round pick went to the Washington Capitals as the result of a trade on June 28, 2014 that sent a sixth-round pick in 2014 (164th overall), Nashville's seventh-round pick in 2014 (192nd overall) and a seventh-round pick in 2015 to Winnipeg in exchange for Edward Pasquale and this pick.
 The Ottawa Senators' sixth-round pick went to the Minnesota Wild as the result of a trade on March 12, 2013 that sent Matt Kassian to Ottawa in exchange for this pick.
 The Washington Capitals sixth-round pick went to the Winnipeg Jets as the result of a trade on June 28, 2014 that sent Edward Pasquale and a sixth-round pick in 2014 (159th overall) to Washington in exchange for Nashville's seventh-round pick in 2014 (192nd overall), a seventh-round pick in 2015 and this pick.
 The Columbus Blue Jackets' sixth-round pick went to the Minnesota Wild as the result of a trade on June 30, 2013 that sent Justin Falk to the New York Rangers in exchange for Benn Ferriero and this pick.
New York previously acquired this pick as the result of a trade on April 3, 2013 that sent Marian Gaborik, Blake Parlett and Steven Delisle to Columbus in exchange for Derick Brassard, Derek Dorsett, John Moore and this pick.
 The Anaheim Ducks' sixth-round pick went to the Calgary Flames as the result of a trade on November 21, 2013 that sent Tim Jackman to Anaheim in exchange for this pick.
 The Boston Bruins' sixth-round pick went to the St. Louis Blues as the result of a trade on April 3, 2013 that sent Wade Redden to Boston in exchange for this pick (being conditional at the time of the trade). The condition – St. Louis will receive a sixth-round pick in 2014 if Redden appears in one playoff game in the 2013 Stanley Cup playoffs for the Bruins – was converted on May 1, 2013.
 The New York Rangers' sixth-round pick went to the Chicago Blackhawks as the result of a trade on June 27, 2014 that sent a first-round pick and Florida's third-round pick both in 2014 (27th and 62nd overall) to San Jose in exchange for a first-round pick in 2014 (20th overall) and this pick.
San Jose previously acquired this pick as the result of a trade on January 16, 2013 that sent Brandon Mashinter to New York in exchange for Tommy Grant and this pick (being conditional at the time of the trade). The condition – San Jose will receive a sixth-round pick in 2014 if Mashinter was a signed player on the Rangers reserve list at some point during the 2013–14 NHL season. – was converted on August 5, 2013 when Mashinter re-signed with the Rangers for the 2013–14 NHL season.

Round seven

Notes
 The Florida Panthers' seventh-round pick was re-acquired as the result of a trade on July 5, 2013 that sent George Parros to Montreal in exchange for Philippe Lefebvre and this pick.
Montreal previously acquired this pick as the result of a trade on June 30, 2013 that sent a seventh-round pick in 2013 to Florida in exchange for this pick.
 The New York Islanders' seventh-round pick went to the Tampa Bay Lightning as the result of a trade on June 28, 2014 that sent a seventh-round pick in 2014 (200th overall) and a seventh-round pick in 2015 to New York in exchange for this pick.
 The Winnipeg Jets' seventh-round pick went to the Ottawa Senators as the result of a trade on June 28, 2014 that sent a sixth-round pick in 2015 to Winnipeg in exchange for this pick.
 The New Jersey Devils' seventh-round pick went to the Arizona Coyotes as the result of a trade on April 3, 2013 that sent Steve Sullivan to New Jersey in exchange for this pick.
 The Nashville Predators' seventh-round pick went to the Winnipeg Jets as the result of a trade on June 28, 2014 that sent Edward Pasquale and a sixth-round pick in 2014 (159th overall) to Washington in exchange for a sixth-round pick in 2014 (164th overall), a seventh-round pick in 2015 and this pick.
Washington previously acquired this pick as the result of a trade on April 19, 2014 that sent Jaynen Rissling to Nashville in exchange for this pick.
 The Tampa Bay Lightning's seventh-round pick went to the New York Islanders as the result of a trade on June 28, 2014 that sent a seventh-round pick in 2014 (185th overall) to Tampa Bay in exchange for a seventh-round pick in 2015 and this pick.
 The San Jose Sharks' seventh-round pick went to the Detroit Red Wings as the result of a trade on June 10, 2012 that sent Brad Stuart to San Jose in exchange for Andrew Murray and this pick (being conditional at the time of the trade). The condition – Stuart is re-signed by San Jose for the 2012–13 season – was converted on June 18, 2012.
 The Anaheim Ducks' seventh-round pick was re-acquired as the result of a trade on November 16, 2013 that sent Peter Holland and Brad Staubitz to Toronto in exchange for Jesse Blacker, a conditional second-round pick in 2014 and this pick.
Toronto previously acquired this pick as the result of a trade on March 15, 2013 that sent Dave Steckel to Anaheim in exchange for Ryan Lasch and this pick.
 The New York Rangers' seventh-round pick went to the Los Angeles Kings as the result of a trade on January 4, 2014 that sent Daniel Carcillo to New York in exchange for this pick (being conditional at the time of the trade). The condition and date of conversion are unknown.

Draftees based on nationality

North American draftees by state or province

Draftees based on league

Notes
In addition to the 35 players who played in the USHL during the 2013–14 season, 16 players were drafted who played in the USHL during the 2012–13 season and have moved on to the NCAA or other leagues.

See also
 2011–12 NHL transactions
 2012–13 NHL transactions
 2013–14 NHL transactions
 2014–15 NHL transactions
 2014–15 NHL season
 List of first overall NHL draft picks
 List of NHL players

References

External links
2014 NHL Entry Draft player stats at The Internet Hockey Database

Draft
NHL Entry Draft
NHL Entry Draft
2014 in Philadelphia
Ice hockey in Philadelphia
National Hockey League Entry Draft